Burntisland in Fife was a royal burgh that returned one commissioner to the Parliament of Scotland and to the Convention of Estates.

After the Acts of Union 1707, Burntisland, Dysart, Kinghorn and Kirkcaldy formed the Dysart district of burghs, returning one member between them to the House of Commons of Great Britain.

List of burgh commissioners

 1661: George Gairdin (or Gairnes) (died c.1662) 
 1663: Gilbert Haliburton   
 1665 convention, 1667 convention, 1669: David Seaton, merchant-burgess  (died 1669) 
 1670–72: William Gedd   (died 1672)  
 1673–74: James Dewar, merchant-trafficker  
 1678 convention, 1681–82: James Dewar, bailie 
 1685–86: Michael Seton, baillie 
 1689 convention, 1689–1701: Alexander Gedd, bailie 
 1702–07: Sir John Erskine of Alva

See also
 List of constituencies in the Parliament of Scotland at the time of the Union

References

Constituencies of the Parliament of Scotland (to 1707)
Politics of Fife
History of Fife
Constituencies disestablished in 1707
1707 disestablishments in Scotland
Burntisland